Krzysztof Bociek (born 30 March 1974) is a Polish former footballer who is last known to have played as a forward for FC Den Bosch.

Career

Bociek started his career with Polish side Stal Mielec, where he made 65 league appearances and scored 19 goals. In 1994, Bociek signed for Greek top flight side PAOK. In 1995, he returned to Stal Mielec in Poland. In 1996, he signed for Dutch club FC Volendam.

References

External links

 

Polish expatriate sportspeople in Greece
1974 births
Expatriate footballers in the Netherlands
Stal Mielec players
Ekstraklasa players
Eredivisie players
Eerste Divisie players
PAOK FC players
AZ Alkmaar players
FC Den Bosch players
FC Volendam players
Living people
Association football forwards
Expatriate footballers in Greece
Polish footballers
Polish expatriate sportspeople in the Netherlands
Polish expatriate footballers
NEC Nijmegen players
People from Mielec